Tonightly with Tom Ballard was an Australian comedy entertainment show presented by comedian Tom Ballard and regular contributors Bridie Connell, Greg Larsen, Greta Lee Jackson and Nina Oyama. It aired on ABC Comedy from 4 December 2017 until 7 September 2018. The show was described as an "irreverent, fast-paced" look at the day in news and culture, with Ballard calling it "undergraduate filth". Tonightly with Tom Ballard was filmed a few hours before broadcast in Ultimo, a suburb in Sydney's inner-city.

Reception
An early review of Tonightly with Tom Ballard was positive, saying "the writing is top notch, the performances strong and getting stronger, and the filmed inserts are beautifully realised."

The show was criticised after a skit called Kevin Bailey, the candidate for the Australian Conservatives in the 2018 Batman by-election, a "cunt", with the leader of the party, Cory Bernardi, and the Education Minister, Simon Birmingham calling for someone to lose their job over it, and the Minister for Communications, Mitch Fifield asking for an investigation and an apology to Mr Bailey. The ABC later personally apologised to Mr Bailey, but defended the decision to air the segment, while expressions of support for the show were made by Joe Hildebrand, Wil Anderson and Annabel Crabb.

In August 2018, the show received criticism for a musical segment which highlighted perceived contradictions between Prime Minister Scott Morrison's Christian faith and his actions as a politician. The ABC rejected the suggestion that the segment "attack[ed]" Morrison's religion or religious beliefs, stating that "[m]ost viewers would understand the skit to be a satirical way of examining the relationship between such beliefs and government policies on asylum seekers".

'Sex Pest', a song from the series performed by Bridie Connell and Wyatt Nixon-Lloyd, won the 2018 ARIA Award for Best Comedy Release. Tonightly Albumly, a collection of original songs from the series' run, was released on all digital services via ABC Music.

Discontinued
In mid-August 2018 it was announced that Tonightly with Tom Ballard would be dropped from the ABC line up and would air for the last time on 7 September 2018.

Episodes
This is a list of episodes for Tonightly with Tom Ballard which aired on ABC Comedy from 4 December 2017, to 7 September 2018.

Discography

Albums

Awards and nominations

ARIA Music Awards
The ARIA Music Awards are a set of annual ceremonies presented by Australian Recording Industry Association (ARIA), which recognise excellence, innovation, and achievement across all genres of the music of Australia. They commenced in 1987.

! 
|-
| 2018 || "Sex Pest" (by Bridie and Wyatt & Tonightly with Tom Ballard) || ARIA Award for Best Comedy Release ||  || 
|-

References

Australian Broadcasting Corporation original programming
Australian comedy television series
2017 Australian television series debuts
2018 Australian television series endings
English-language television shows